Pombal is a civil parish in the municipality of Pombal, Portugal.  The population in 2011 was 17,187, in an area of 97.61 km².

References

Parishes of Pombal, Portugal